Aslaug Blytt (24 April 1899– 22 April 1966) was a Norwegian art historian and museum manager, and politician.

Biography
She was born in Bergen as the daughter of Johan Nicolai Lieske Blytt (1871–1953) and Sigrid Hanssen (1876–1958). 
She received a master's degree from the University of Oslo in 1935.
She worked 1935–47 as an associate professor at Bergen Cathedral School.
In 1947 she moved to Oslo as a museum lecturer at the National Gallery of Norway.  In 1950, she moved back to Bergen to be head of the  Rasmus Meyer art collection (Rasmus Meyers Samlinger) and Bergen Billedgalleri.    
She is particularly known for her book about the painter Lars Hertervig.
She was also a politician for the Norwegian Labour Party. After retiring in 1964, she received the King's Medal of Merit in gold. 

During the German occupation of Norway she spent about one year incarcerated at the Grini concentration camp.

References

1899 births
1966 deaths
Curators from Bergen
University of Oslo alumni
Norwegian art historians
Grini concentration camp survivors
Labour Party (Norway) politicians
Place of death missing